Buzykovo is a village in Kashinsky District of Tver Oblast, Russia. It is located close to the town of Kashin and the village of Yurino.

Sources
 Кашинан кӀоштан индексаш 
 Климат Тверской области 
 2002 2010 шш. лараран микрохаамаш 

Rural localities in Kashinsky District